The 1978–79 FIBA European Champions Cup was the 22nd season of the European top-tier level professional basketball club competition FIBA European Champions Cup (now called EuroLeague). The Final was held at the Palais des Sports, in Grenoble, France, on April 5, 1979. Bosna defeated Emerson Varese, by a result of 96–93. This final was the last in an impressive run of ten consecutive finals appearances for Varese, and is also notable for Bosna's Žarko Varajić scoring 45 points, a still active record for the number of most points scored in a single EuroLeague Finals game.

Competition system

 22 teams (European national domestic league champions, plus the then current title holders), playing in a tournament system, entered a Quarterfinals group stage, divided into six groups that played a round-robin. The final standing was based on individual wins and defeats. In the case of a tie between two or more teams after the group stage, the following criteria were used to decide the final classification: 1) number of wins in one-to-one games between the teams; 2) basket average between the teams; 3) general basket average within the group
 The 6 group winners of the Quarterfinals group stage advanced to the Semifinals group stage, which was played as a single group under the same round-robin rules.
 The group winner and the runner-up of the Semifinals group stage qualified for the final, which was played at a predetermined venue.

Quarterfinals group stage

Semifinals group stage

Final
April 5, Palais des Sports, Grenoble, attendance: 10,603

|}

Awards

FIBA European Champions Cup Finals Top Scorer
 Žarko Varajić ( Bosna, 45 points scored)

References

External links
1978–79 FIBA European Champions Cup
 1978–79 FIBA European Champions Cup
 Champions Cup 1978–79 Line-ups and Stats

EuroLeague seasons
FIBA